This is a list of fiction set in or near the city of Chicago.

Novels

Short stories
 "Deadly City," March, 1953 issue of If magazine under the pseudonym Ivar Jorgensen (later made into the motion picture Target Earth; the story was about an alien invasion and evacuation of Chicago)
 Chicago Stories: 40 Dramatic Fictions by Michael Czyzniejewski, Jacob S Knabb and Rob Funderburk, 2012
 The Coast of Chicago: Stories by Stuart Dybek, 2004
 Chicago Style Novella by R. Felini 2013
 "The Box of Robbers" a fairy tale by Lyman Frank Baum, reprinted in American Fairy Tales by Lyman Frank Baum, English Classical Literature, KAPO, 2015.  Original, 1901. .

Plays and musicals
American Buffalo
Be Like Water
Bleacher Bums
Chicago - musical, nominated for ten Tony Awards in 1976
Chicago - play
Clybourne Park
Do Black Patent Leather Shoes Really Reflect Up?
The Front Page
Glengarry Glen Ross
Happy End
In the Jungle of Cities
Ma Rainey's Black Bottom
Mean Girls - musical, nominated for 12 Tony Awards in 2018
Proof
A Raisin in the Sun - nominated for four Tony Awards in 1960
The Resistible Rise of Arturo Ui
Sexual Perversity in Chicago
Show Boat
Superior Donuts

Films
About Last Night (1986)
Above the Law (1988)
The Accountant (2016) - partly in Chicago (box office #1 film in the U.S.)
Adventures in Babysitting (1987)
The Adventures of Lucky Pierre (1961)
Against All Hope (1982)
Al Capone (1959) (mob film) 
Ali (2001)
Allah Tantou (1989)
American Gun (2005)
American Reel (1999)
Angel Eyes (2001)
Anything's Possible (1999)
April Fools (2007)
Archive (2020)
August Rush (2007)
Avatar: The Way of Water (2022) 
The Babe (1992)
Baby on Board (2009)
Baby's Day Out (1994)
Backdraft (1991) (box office #1 film in the U.S.)
Bad Boys (1983)
Barbershop (2002) (box office #1 film in the U.S.)
Barbershop 2: Back in Business (2004) (#1 film in U.S.)
Barbershop: The Next Cut (2016)
Batman (1989)
The Batman (2022)
Batman Begins (2005)
Batman: Gotham Knight (2008)
Batman v Superman: Dawn of Justice (2016)
Beats (2019)
Beginning of the End (1957) – set in downstate Illinois and Chicago
Betrayed (1988)
The Big Brawl (1980)
Big Shots (1987)
Blankman (1994)
Blind (1994)
Blink (1994)
The Blues Brothers (1980)
Blues Brothers 2000 (1998)
The Boss (2016) (#1 film in U.S.)
Brannigan (1975)
The Break-Up (2006) (#1 in the U.S.)
The Breakfast Club (1985)
Breed of Men (1919)
Bridesmaids (2011) (partly in Chicago)
Bridge (1988)
The Brute (1920)
Bugsy Malone (1976) (partly in Chicago) (mob film)
Butterfly on a Wheel (2007)
Call Northside 777 (1948)
Candyman (1992) - based on a book originally set in London
Candyman (2021), sequel to the original, (box office #1 film in the U.S.)
Capone (1975) (mob film)
Carrie (1952)
Casino (1995) - scenes labeled as "Back Home" are in Chicago (mob film)
Category 6: Day of Destruction (2004) - partly in Chicago (CBS mini series)
Chain Reaction (1996)
Chicago (1927)
Chicago (2002) (Academy Award for Best Picture)
Chicago Cab (1997)
Chicago Deadline (1949) (film noir)
Chicago Overcoat (2009) (mob film)
Child's Play (1988) (#1 in U.S.)
Child's Play 2 (1990) (#1 in U.S.)
Chi-Raq (2015)
City That Never Sleeps (1953) (film noir)
Class (1983)
Code of Silence (1985)
Colombiana (2011)
The Company (2003)
Continental Divide (1981)
Cooley High (1975)
Curly Sue (1991)
Damien: Omen II (1978) (#1 film in the U.S.)
Danger Lights (1930) (partly in Chicago)
The Dark Knight (2008)
The Dark Knight Rises (2012) 
Death of a President (2006)
Death Wish (2018) 
Dhoom 3 (2013) (Hindi film)
The Dilemma (2011)
Divergent (2014) (box office #1 film in the U.S.)
The Divergent Series: Insurgent (2015) (#1 in the U.S.)
Derailed (2005)
Dick Tracy (1990)
Dragonfly (2002)
The Dumb Girl of Portici (1916)
Eagle Eye (2008) (#1 film in U.S.)
Eight Men Out (1988)
The Express: The Ernie Davis Story (2009)
Ferris Bueller's Day Off (1986)
Flatliners (1990)
The Flash (2023)
The Fugitive (1993) (#1 film in the U.S.)
The Fury (1978)
Girls Just Want to Have Fun (1985)
Go Fish (1994)
The Grudge 2 (2006) (#1 film in U.S.)
The Grudge 3 (2009)
Guilty as Sin (1993)
Hardball (2001) (#1 film in U.S.)
Harry and Tonto (1974)
Heaven is a Playground (1991)
Henry: Portrait of a Serial Killer (1986) - partly in Chicago
Hero (1992)
High Fidelity (2000) - based on a book originally set in London
His New Job (1915)
Home Alone (1990) (#1 film in the U.S.)
Home Alone 2: Lost in New York (1992) (partly in Chicago) (#1 film in U.S.)
Home Alone 3 (1997)
The Homesteader (1919)
Hoodlum (1997)
Hope Floats (1998) - partly in Chicago
The Hunter (1980) - partly in Chicago
 The Great Ziegfeld (1936)
I Love Trouble (1994)
I, Robot (2004) (#1 in U.S.)
I Want Someone to Eat Cheese With (2007)
In the Depth of Our Hearts (1920)
It's the Rage (1999)
Judgment Night (1993)
Jupiter Ascending (2015) directed by the Wachowskis
Just Visiting (2001)
Justice League (2021)
King of the Rodeo (1929)
Kissing A Fool (1998)
The Lake House (2006)
A League of Their Own (1992) (#1 in the U.S.)
Light It Up (1999)
Little Fockers (2010) (#1 in the U.S.)
Looking for Mr. Goodbar (1977)
Love and Action in Chicago (1999)
Love Jones (1997)
Lucas (1986)
Man of Steel (2013)
The Man with the Golden Arm (1955)
Mean Girls (2004) (#1 film in U.S.) - set in Evanston
Medium Cool (1969)
Meet the Parents (2000) (#1 in the U.S.) - partly set in Chicago
Mercury Rising (1998)
Message in a Bottle - partly set in Chicago
Michael (1996) - partly in Chicago (#1 film in U.S.)
Mickey One (1965)
Midnight Run (1988) - partly in Chicago (mob film)
Miracle on 34th Street (1994) - partly in Chicago
Mission Impossible (1996)
Mo' Money (1992)
The Monkey Hustle (1976)
Music Box (1989)
My Best Friend's Wedding (1997)
My Big Fat Greek Wedding (2002)
My Bodyguard (1980)
National Lampoon's Christmas Vacation (1989) (#1 film in U.S.)
National Lampoon's European Vacation (1985) - starts in Chicago
National Lampoon's Vacation (1983) - partly in Chicago (#1 film in U.S.)
Natural Born Killers (1994) - partly in Chicago
The Negotiator (1998)
Never Been Kissed (1999)
Next of Kin (1989) - set in Chicago and Kentucky (mob film)
A Night in the Life of Jimmy Reardon (1988)
Nothing in Common (1986) - partly in Chicago
Office Christmas Party (2016)
On the Line (2001)
Only the Lonely (1991)
Opportunity Knocks (1990)
Ordinary People (1980) (Academy Award for Best Picture)
The Package (1989)
Planes, Trains & Automobiles (1987)
Poltergeist III (1988)
Prelude to a Kiss (1992)
Primal Fear (1996)
Prime Cut (1972) – set in Chicago and in Kansas City, Kansas
The Princess Bride (1987) (Modern Scenes set in Evanston, Illinois)
Proof (2005)
The Public Enemy (1931) (mob film)
Public Enemies (neo-noir, mob film) (2009)
Raisin in the Sun (1961)
Rampage (2018)
Random Encounter (1998)
Rapid Fire (1992)
Raw Deal (1986)
The Razor's Edge (1946) - based on Maughaum's novel of the same title
Red Heat (1988)
The Relic (1997) - based on a book originally set in New York City (#1 film in the U.S.)
Return to Me (2000)
Ri¢hie Ri¢h (1994) - scenes filmed in Chicago
Risky Business (1983) - set in the North Shore
Road to Perdition (2002) (#1 film in the U.S.) (mob film)
Robin and the 7 Hoods (1964)
Roll Bounce (2005)
Rookie of the Year (1993)
Running Scared (1986)
The St. Valentine's Day Massacre  (1967) (mob film)
Save the Last Dance (2001) (#1 film in the U.S.)
Scarface (1932) (mob film)
Scooby-Doo! Stage Fright (2013)
Shall We Dance? (2004)
Sheba, Baby (1975) - partly in Chicago
She's Having a Baby (1988)
Silver Streak (1976) - partly in Chicago
Sleepless In Seattle (1993) - partly in Chicago
Slim (1937) - partly in Chicago
Some Like It Hot (1959)  - partly in Chicago (mob film)
Somewhere in Time (1980) - partly in Chicago
Soul Food (1997)
A Sound of Thunder (2005)
Source Code (2011)
Spider-Man 2 (2004) (#1 film in U.S.)  - partly in Chicago
The Sting (1973)  - partly in Chicago; Academy Award for Best Picture (mob film)
Stir of Echoes (1999)
Stolen Summer (2001)
Straight Talk (1992)
Stranger than Fiction (2006)
Strawberry Fields (1997)
Streets of Fire (1984)
Suicide Squad (2016)
Surviving Christmas (2003)
That Royle Girl (1925)
Thief (1981)
The Santa Clause (1994)
The Santa Clause 2 (2002)
The Santa Clause 3: The Escape Clause (2006)
The Thief Who Came to Dinner (1973)
Three to Tango (1999)
Tommy Boy (1995) (#1 film in U.S.) - partly in Chicago and Wisconsin
Transformers: Dark of the Moon (2011) (#1 film in U.S.)
Transformers: Age of Extinction (2014) (#1 in the U.S.)
Transformers: The Last Knight (2017) (#1 in the U.S.)
Two Fathers: Justice for the Innocent (1994)
Ultraviolet (2006)
The Unborn (2009)
Uncle Buck (1989) (#1 film in U.S.)
The Untouchables (1987) (mob film)
U.S. Marshals (1998) - partly in Chicago
Vegas Vacation (1997) - starts in Chicago
V.I. Warshawski (1991)
Wanted (2008)
The Watcher (2000) (#1 in the U.S.)
Wayne's World (1992) (#1 film in the U.S.) - partly in Chicago and the suburb Aurora
Wayne's World 2 (1993)  (#1 in the U.S.) - partly in Chicago
The Weather Man (2005)
A Wedding (1978)
What Women Want (2000) (#1 in the U.S.)
When Harry Met Sally... (1989)  - partly in Chicago
While You Were Sleeping (1995) (#1 in the U.S.)
The Whole Nine Yards (2000) (#1 in the U.S.)
Wicker Park (2004)
Wildcats (1986)
Within Our Gates (1920)

Although not set in the city's limits, the John Hughes directed films Sixteen Candles, The Breakfast Club, Pretty in Pink (1986) (#1 film in U.S.), and Weird Science take place in the fictional town of Shermer, Illinois, which is based on Northbrook, Illinois.

In The Matrix (1999, directed by the Wachowskis from Chicago), the subway sets were based on the CTA. One of the trains is clearly a Brown Line train, which in reality, barring construction, never goes underground.

Chicago destroyed on film
 In Old Chicago (1938) - destroyed by the Great Chicago Fire
 Independence Day (1996) - mentioned
 Chain Reaction (1996) - parts of the city destroyed by an explosion caused by a hydrogen reactor
 Category 6: Day of Destruction (2004) - destroyed by a series of tornadoes and a category 6 hurricane over the Great Lakes
 Transformers: Dark of the Moon (2011) - seriously damaged by the Decepticons' assault on the city as well as the final battle between the Autobots and Decepticons (#1 film in U.S.)
 Transformers: Age of Extinction (2014) - the city was rebuilt five years later, where it was used for KSI first (#1 in U.S.)

Music videos
 "Hard to Handle" by Black Crowes 1990, blues rock
 "Jam" 1992, by Michael Jackson from Gary, he plays Michael Jordan in an abandoned indoor basketball court
 "I Used to Love H.E.R." by Common (rapper) 1994, shows clips from the Southside, jazz rap
 "I'll be Missing You" by Puff Daddy 1997, filmed at the United Terminal at O'Hare Airport
 "Cha Cha Slide" by Chicago's DJ Casper 2000, shows the Marina City towers; house and hip hop
 "I Wish" by R. Kelly 2001, nominated for Best R&B Video at the 2001 MTV Video Music Awards, video start shows the "L" train
 "The Game of Love" by Santana feat. Michelle Branch 2002, filmed in Pilsen
 "Step in the Name of Love" by R. Kelly 2003, filmed on a yacht on Lake Michigan
 "Lyric (song)" by Zwan (Billy Corgan) 2003
 "Overnight Celebrity by Twista feat. Kanye West 2004, video has cameos by Chicago rappers like Da Brat, shows Chicago landmark buildings like the Tribune Tower
 "The Corner (song)" by Common (rapper) feat. Kanye West 2005, video start shows Navy Pier by a frozen Lake Michigan, song is about Chicago
 "Give It All" by Rise Against 2005, they have a mosh pit inside an "L" train
 "Swing Life Away" by Rise Against 2005, video start shows the "L" train
 "Kick Push" by Lupe Fiasco 2006, video shows skateboarding in the city
 "Homecoming" by Kanye West feat Chris Martin of Coldplay 2008, nominated for Best Hip-Hop Video at the 2008 MTV Video Music Awards, video shows the Millennium Park "bean", Cloud Gate, song is about Chicago
 "Re-Education (Through Labor)" by Rise Against 2008
 "You Found Me" by The Fray 2009, filmed on top of skyscrapers
 "1,2,3,4" by Plain White T's 2009, on the VH1 Top 40 Videos of 2009
 "Angels" by Chance the Rapper feat Saba (rapper) 2016, nominated for Best Hip-Hop Video at the 2016 MTV Video Music Awards, video shows Chance rapping on top of the "L" train
 "City in a Garden" by Fall Out Boy 2018, shows Wrigley Field and other city landmarks, song is about Chicago

Television shows
61st Street (2022)
100 Days of Summer (2014)
According to Jim (2001–2009). ABC
Against the Wall (2011)
Animaniacs (2020)
Barbershop: The Series (2005)
Batman: The Animated Series (1992-1995) 
Batwoman (2019-2022)
The Bear (2022-) Hulu
The Beast (2009)
Betrayal (2013-2014)
Better than Us (2018-2019)
Biker Mice from Mars (1993–1996)
Biker Mice from Mars  (2006)
The Bob Newhart Show (1972–1978). CBS
The Boondocks (2005-2014) Adult Swim
Boss (2011–2012)
Buck Rogers in the 25th Century (1979–1981) - in its first season (1979–1980), "New Chicago" functioned as Earth's capital city
The Building  (1993)
Charlie & Co. (1985-1986)
The Chicago Code (2011) Billy Corgan did the theme song. FOX
Chicago Fire (2012–present). NBC
Chicago Hope (1994–2000). Emmy-winner for Mandy Patinkin. CBS
Chicago Med (2015–present). NBC
Chicago P.D. (2014–present). NBC
Chicago Party Aunt (2021). Netflix, animated
Chicago Sons (1997)
Chicago Story (1982)
Coupling (2003) - US version only
The Crazy Ones (2013-2014) with Robin Williams. CBS
Crime Story (1986–1988)
Crisis (2014)
Cupid (1998)
Defiance (2013-2015)
The Dresden Files (2007)
Due South (1994–1996, 1997–1999) - some filming in Toronto, Canada
Early Edition (1996–2000)
Easy (2016)
E/R (1984–1985)
ER (1994–2009). Won 23 Emmy Awards. Most nominated drama show ever. NBC
Exosquad (1993–1995) - Chicago, renamed to Phaeton City, was one of the central locations of the show
Family Matters (1989–1998) Emmy-nominated. ABC
The Flash (2014-)
The Forgotten (2009–2010). ABC
Generations (1989–1991). NBC
The Girlfriend Experience (2016) Starz
The Good Fight (2017–) CBS All Access/Paramount Plus
Good Times (1974–1979) Golden Globe nominated. CBS
The Good Wife (2009–2016) 5-time Emmy winner for Julianna Margulies. CBS
Gotham (2014-2019)
Happy Endings (2011–2013)
Hell on Wheels (2011-2016)
The Hogan Family (1986–1991)
Humans (2015-2018)
It Takes Two (1982-1983). ABC
Invincible (2021-present)
Ironheart (2023)
Kenan & Kel (1996–2000) on Nickelodeon
Kolchak: The Night Stalker (1974–1975)
Lady Blue (1985–1986)
The League (2009–2015)
Legally Mad (2009)
Leverage (2008–2012) - pilot episode only
Life Goes On (1989–1993)
Life With Bonnie (2002–2004)
The Loop (2006–2007)
Lovecraft Country (2021)
M Squad (1957–1960)
Married... with Children (1987–1997). FOX
The Man in the High Castle (2015-2019)
Mike and Molly (2010–2016) Emmy winner in 2011 for Melissa McCarthy. CBS
Mind Games (2014)
Modern Men (2006)
Moon Knight (2022)
My Boys (2006–2010)
Milagros de Navidad (2017). Telemundo
Night Sky (2022)
Pantheon (2022)
Paper Girls (2022)
Pepper Dennis (2006)
Perfect Strangers (1986–1993)
The Playboy Club (2011)
Postcards from Buster (2004-2012) - One Episode set in Chicago, also where Buster Baxter and his dad ride a CTA Brown Line train in the theme song.
The Real O'Neals (2016)
Prison Break (2005–2009) - partly set in Chicago
Punky Brewster (1984–1986). NBC
Punky Brewster (2021). Peacock
Revolution (2012–2014)
Samantha Who? (2007–2009)
The Santa Clauses (2022)
Sense8 (2015–2018) Netflix (directed by the Wachowskis)
Shake It Up (2010–2013) Disney Channel
Shameless (2011–2021) Emmy-winner in 2015 for Joan Cusack. Showtime
Shining Girls (2022-present)
Sirens (2014-2015)
Sisters (1991–1996)
Soul Food: The Series (2000–2004). Emmy-nominated. Showtime
South Side (2019-2021). Comedy Central/HBO Max
Special Unit 2 (2001-2002)
Starting Over (2003–2004 season)
Station Eleven (2021-2022) HBO Max
The Steve Harvey Show (1996–2002). The WB
Still Standing (2002–2006). CBS
Superman & Lois (2021-)
Supernatural (2005-2020)
Terra Nova (2011)
The Time Traveler’s Wife (2022)
Traffic Light (2011)
Trust Me (2009)
Turks (1999)
Two of a Kind (1998–1999). ABC
The Untouchables (1959–1963) Emmy winner. ABC
Webster (1983–1987)
What About Joan? (2001)
Whitney (2011–2013)
Wild Card (2003–2005)

Reality TV
The Real World: Chicago (2002)
Real World: Skeletons (2014–2015)

Video games
This is a list of video games in which a major part of the action takes place in the city. This list does not count sports games or flight simulators, save for Pilotwings 64 and Tom Clancy's H.A.W.X.

18 Wheels of Steel series
Atomic Heart
BattleTanx
Ben 10: Protector of Earth
Blues Brothers 2000
The Bureau: XCOM Declassified
Call of Duty: Infinite Warfare
Call of Duty Modern Warfare II
Chicago 90
Chicago 1930
Chicago Enforcer
The Crew
Crimson Skies: High Road to Revenge
Cruisin' USA 
The Dark Pictures Anthology: The Devil in Me
Deus Ex: Invisible War
Driver 2
Emergency Call Ambulance
Empire of Sin
Grid 2
Grid Autosport
Grid Legends
Hitman: Absolution
Hi-Fi Rush
Lethal Enforcers
Michael Jordan in Chaos in the Windy City
Midtown Madness
Mob Enforcer
Need for Speed: ProStreet
Need for Speed: The Run
Need for Speed Unbound
Nocturne
Perfect Dark
Pilotwings 64
Project Gotham Racing 2
Rampage 2: Universal Tour
Rampage: Total Destruction
Rampage World Tour
Resistance 2
Shadow Hearts: From the New World
Still Life
Still Life 2
Stranglehold
Stuntman: Ignition
Tekken
TimeSplitters 2
Tom Clancy's H.A.W.X.
Tom Clancy's Splinter Cell: Blacklist
Tony Hawk's Pro Skater 4
Wanted: Weapons of Fate
Watch Dogs
We Are Chicago
Wolfenstein II: The New Colossus

List of games which feature a fictional city closely based on Chicago 

 In Batman: Arkham, as a fictionalized Gotham City in which is almost identical to Chicago: for example some of the buildings like Tribune Tower can be seen within the Arkham franchise. The city also serves as Gotham within the Injustice series as well.

 In Mortal Kombat, Chicago plays a dynamic level known as "street" in which the level appears most of the MK series.

 In Ratchet & Clank, in this fictional utopian city of Aleero City, some of the buildings have a huge representation of Chicago’s magnificent skyscrapers bundled up together.

 In Halo, Chicago in Halo 2 is the multiplayer map known as Foundation.

Comics, manga, and cartoons

Biker Mice from Mars
Blue Beetle
Bojack Horseman Season 6 splits time, with much of the season taking place in Chicago
Cage, volume 1 (April 1992-November 1993) - ongoing series by Marvel Comics featuring the superhero Luke Cage; 20 issues were published
C.O.W.L. 
Ghost
Gunsmith Cats
Kremin 1-4 Grey Productions Inc 1991-1992
Nightwing Vol 3., Issue #18-ongoing
Plastic Man (DC)
Riding Bean
Savage Dragon
Tintin in America

Miniseries, specials or individual episodes
 Agents of S.H.I.E.L.D.
"The End"
 Ben 10
"Monster Weather"
 The Legend of Tarzan
"The Mysterious Visitor"
 Danger Rangers
"Fires and Liars"
 Scooby-Doo and Guess Who?
"The Hot Dog Dog!"

References

External links
City of Chicago's Film Office
Chicago in Science Fiction bibliography
Chicago Magazine's Top 40 Chicago Novels

Lists of television series by setting
Video game lists by setting
 List of fiction set in Chicago
Fiction set in Chicago